This is a glossary for the terminology often encountered in undergraduate quantum mechanics courses.

Cautions:
 Different authors may have different definitions for the same term.
 The discussions are restricted to Schrödinger picture and non-relativistic quantum mechanics.
 Notation:
  - position eigenstate
  - wave function of the state of the system
  - total wave function of a system
  - wave function of a system (maybe a particle)
  - wave function of a particle in position representation, equal to

Formalism

Kinematical postulates 

 a complete set of wave functions
 A basis of the Hilbert space of wave functions with respect to a system.

 bra
 The Hermitian conjugate of a ket is called a bra. . See "bra–ket notation".

 Bra–ket notation

 Density matrix
 Physically, the density matrix is a way to represent pure states and mixed states.
 Mathematically, a density matrix has to satisfy the following conditions:
 
 

 Density operator
 Synonymous to "density matrix".

 Dirac notation
 Synonymous to "bra–ket notation".

 Hilbert space
 Given a system, the possible pure state can be represented as a vector in a Hilbert space. Each ray (vectors differ by phase and magnitude only) in the corresponding Hilbert space represent a state.

 Ket
 A wave function expressed in the form  is called a ket. See "bra–ket notation".

 Mixed state
 A mixed state is a statistical ensemble of pure state.
 criterion:
 Pure state: 
 Mixed state: 

 Normalizable wave function
 A wave function  is said to be normalizable if .

 Normalized wave function
 A wave function  is said to be normalized if .

 Pure state
 A state which can be represented as a wave function / ket in Hilbert space / solution of Schrödinger equation is called pure state. See "mixed state".

 Quantum numbers
 a way of representing a state by several numbers, which corresponds to a complete set of commuting observables.

 Spin wave function
Part of a wave function of particle(s). See "total wave function of a particle".

 Spinor
Synonymous to "spin wave function".

 Spatial wave function
Part of a wave function of particle(s). See "total wave function of a particle".

 State
 A state is a complete description of the observable properties of a physical system.
 Sometimes the word is used as a synonym of "wave function" or "pure state".

 State vector
 synonymous to "wave function".

 Statistical ensemble
 A large number of copies of a system.

 System
 A sufficiently isolated part in the universe for investigation.

 Tensor product of Hilbert space

 Total wave function of a particle
 For single-particle system, the total wave function  of a particle can be expressed as a product of spatial wave function and the spinor. The total wave functions are in the tensor product space of the Hilbert space of the spatial part (which is spanned by the position eigenstates) and the Hilbert space for the spin.

 Wave function
 The word "wave function" could mean one of following:
 A vector in Hilbert space which can represent a state; synonymous to "ket" or "state vector".
 The state vector in a specific basis. It can be seen as a covariant vector in this case.
 The state vector in position representation, e.g. , where  is the position eigenstate.

Dynamics

 Degeneracy
 See "degenerate energy level".

Degenerate energy level
 If the energy of different state (wave functions which are not scalar multiple of each other) is the same, the energy level is called degenerate.
 There is no degeneracy in 1D system.

 Energy spectrum
 The energy spectrum refers to the possible energy of a system.
 For bound system (bound states), the energy spectrum is discrete; for unbound system (scattering states), the energy spectrum is continuous.
 related mathematical topics: Sturm–Liouville equation

 Hamiltonian 
 The operator represents the total energy of the system.

 Schrödinger equation
  -- (1)
 (1) is sometimes called "Time-Dependent Schrödinger equation" (TDSE).

 Time-Independent Schrödinger Equation (TISE)
 A modification of the Time-Dependent Schrödinger equation as an eigenvalue problem. The solutions are energy eigenstate of the system.
  -- (2)

Dynamics related to single particle in a potential / other spatial properties
In this situation, the SE is given by the form

 It can be derived from (1) by considering  and 

 Bound state
 A state is called bound state if its position probability density at infinite tends to zero for all the time. Roughly speaking, we can expect to find the particle(s) in a finite size region with certain probability. More precisely,   when , for all .
 There is a criterion in terms of energy:
 Let  be the expectation energy of the state. It is a bound state iff .

 Position representation and momentum representation
 Position representation of a wave function: ,
 momentum representation of a wave function:  ;
 where  is the position eigenstate and  the momentum eigenstate respectively.
 The two representations are linked by Fourier transform.

 Probability amplitude
 A probability amplitude is of the form  .

 Probability current
 Having the metaphor of probability density as mass density, then probability current  is the current:
 

 The probability current and probability density together satisfy the continuity equation:
 

 Probability density
 Given the wave function of a particle,  is the probability density at position  and time .  means the probability of finding the particle near .

 Scattering state
 The wave function of scattering state can be understood as a propagating wave. See also "bound state".
 There is a criterion in terms of energy:
 Let  be the expectation energy of the state. It is a scattering state iff .

 Square-integrable
 Square-integrable is a necessary condition for a function being the position/momentum representation of a wave function of a bound state of the system.
 Given the position representation  of a state vector of a wave function, square-integrable means:
 1D case: .
 3D case: .

 Stationary state
 A stationary state of a bound system is an eigenstate of Hamiltonian operator. Classically, it corresponds to standing wave. It is equivalent to the following things:
 an eigenstate of the Hamiltonian operator
 an eigenfunction of Time-Independent Schrödinger Equation
 a state of definite energy
 a state which "every expectation value is constant in time"
 a state whose probability density does not change with respect to time, i.e.

Measurement postulates 

 Born's rule
 Collapse
 "Collapse" means the sudden process which the state of the system will "suddenly" change to an eigenstate of the observable during measurement.
 Eigenstates
 An eigenstate of an operator  is a vector satisfied the eigenvalue equation: , where  is a scalar.
 Usually, in bra–ket notation, the eigenstate will be represented by its corresponding eigenvalue if the corresponding observable is understood.

 Expectation value
  can be calculated by:
 .
 If the state is given by a density matrix , .

 Hermitian operator
 An operator satisfying .
 Equivalently,  for all allowable wave function .

 Observable
 Mathematically, it is represented by a Hermitian operator.

Indistinguishable particles 
 Exchange

 Intrinsically identical particles
 If the intrinsic properties (properties that can be measured but are independent of the quantum state, e.g. charge, total spin, mass) of two particles are the same, they are said to be (intrinsically) identical.

 Indistinguishable particles
 If a system shows measurable differences when one of its particles is replaced by another particle, these two particles are called distinguishable.

 Bosons
Bosons are particles with integer spin (s = 0, 1, 2, ... ). They can either be elementary (like photons) or composite (such as mesons, nuclei or even atoms). There are five known elementary bosons: the four force carrying gauge bosons γ (photon), g (gluon), Z (Z boson) and W (W boson), as well as the Higgs boson.

 Fermions
Fermions are particles with half-integer spin (s = 1/2, 3/2, 5/2, ... ). Like bosons, they can be elementary or composite particles. There are two types of elementary fermions: quarks and leptons, which are the main constituents of ordinary matter.

 Anti-symmetrization of wave functions

 Symmetrization of wave functions

 Pauli exclusion principle

Quantum statistical mechanics 
 Bose–Einstein distribution
 Bose–Einstein condensation
 Bose–Einstein condensation state (BEC state)
 Fermi energy
 Fermi–Dirac distribution
 Slater determinant

Nonlocality 
 Entanglement
 Bell's inequality
 Entangled state
 separable state
 no-cloning theorem

Rotation: spin/angular momentum 
 Spin

 angular momentum
 Clebsch–Gordan coefficients
 singlet state and triplet state

Approximation methods 
 adiabatic approximation
 Born–Oppenheimer approximation
 WKB approximation
 time-dependent perturbation theory
 time-independent perturbation theory

Historical Terms / semi-classical treatment 
 Ehrenfest theorem
 A theorem connecting the classical mechanics and result derived from Schrödinger equation.
 first quantization
 
 wave–particle duality

Uncategorized terms
 uncertainty principle
 Canonical commutation relations
 Path integral

 wavenumber

See also
 Mathematical formulations of quantum mechanics
 List of mathematical topics in quantum theory
 List of quantum-mechanical potentials
 Introduction to quantum mechanics

Notes

References

 Elementary textbooks
 
 
 
 
 Graduate textook
 
 Other
 
 

Quantum Mechanics, Glossary Of Elementary
Quantum mechanics
Wikipedia glossaries using description lists